The 2022–23 Grasshopper Club Zürich season is the club's second season back in the Swiss Super League, after winning promotion in 2021 and ending the previous season in 8th place, just ahead of the relegation playoff spot. The season will start on July 17, 2022. Grasshoppers will also participate in the Swiss Cup.

Squad

Players

Players in italic left the club during the season.

Players out on loan

Coaching staff

Transfers

In

Out

Absences

Injuries and other Absences

Suspensions

Competitions

Overview

Swiss Super League

League table

Placement Progression

Results

Swiss Cup

Opponent's league indicated in brackets.

Pre-season and friendlies

Statistics
Goalscorers
{| class="wikitable" style="text-align:center"
|-
!width=15|
!width=15|
!width=15|
!width=15|
!width=145|Name
!width=50|League
!width=50|Cup
!width=50|Total
|-
!rowspan=3|1
|40
|MF
|
|style="text-align:left"|Hayao Kawabe
|8
|0
|8
|-
|27
|FW
|
|style="text-align:left"|Renat Dadashov
|7
|1
|8
|-
|95
|FW
|
|style="text-align:left"|Guilherme Schettine
|6
|2
|8
|-
!rowspan=3|4
|7
|MF
|
|style="text-align:left"|Tsiy-William Ndenge
|3
|0
|3
|-
|10
|MF
|
|style="text-align:left"|Petar Pusic
|1
|2
|3
|-
|28
|MF
|
|style="text-align:left"|Christián Herc
|3
|0
|3
|-
!rowspan=4|7
|14
|DF
|
|style="text-align:left"|Tomás Ribeiro
|2
|0
|2
|-
|15
|DF
|
|style="text-align:left"|Ayumu Seko
|0
|2
|2
|-
|22
|FW
|
|style="text-align:left"|Francis Momoh
|1
|1
|2
|-
|77
|DF
|
|style="text-align:left"|Bendegúz Bolla
|2
|0
|2
|-
!rowspan=6|11
|8
|MF
|
|style="text-align:left"|Giotto Morandi
|1
|0
|1
|-
|9
|MF
|
|style="text-align:left"|Shkelqim Demhasaj
|0
|1
|1
|-
|17
|MF
|
|style="text-align:left"|Dion Kacuri
|1
|0
|1
|-
|20
|FW
|
|style="text-align:left"|Noah Blasucci
|0
|1
|1
|-
|23
|MF
|
|style="text-align:left"|Meritan Shabani
|1
|0
|1
|-
|57
|FW
|
|style="text-align:left"|Filipe de Carvalho
|1
|0
|1
|- class="sortbottom"
!colspan=5|Own goals
|1
|0
|1
|-
!colspan=5|Totals
!38
!10
!48

Players in italic left the club during the season.
Assists
{| class="wikitable" style="text-align:center"!width=15
|-
!
!width=15|
!width=15|
!width=15|
!width=145|Name
!width=50|League
!width=50|Cup
!width=50|Total
|-
!rowspan=1|1
|40
|MF
|
|style="text-align:left"|Hayao Kawabe
|5
|2
|7
|-
!rowspan=1|2
|8
|MF
|
|style="text-align:left"|Giotto Morandi
|5
|0
|5
|-
!rowspan=3|3
|10
|MF
|
|style="text-align:left"|Petar Pusic
|3
|1
|4
|-
|22
|FW
|
|style="text-align:left"|Francis Momoh
|4
|0
|4
|-
|77
|DF
|
|style="text-align:left"|Bendegúz Bolla
|4
|0
|4
|-
!rowspan=1|6
|28
|MF
|
|style="text-align:left"|Christián Herc
|3
|0
|3
|-
!rowspan=1|7
|27
|FW
|
|style="text-align:left"|Renat Dadashov
|2
|0
|2
|-
!rowspan=9|8
|7
|MF
|
|style="text-align:left"|Tsiy-William Ndenge
|1
|0
|1
|-
|9
|MF
|
|style="text-align:left"|Shkelqim Demhasaj
|0
|1
|1
|-
|14
|DF
|
|style="text-align:left"|Tomás Ribeiro
|1
|0
|1
|-
|15
|DF
|
|style="text-align:left"|Ayumu Seko
|1
|0
|1
|-
|23
|MF
|
|style="text-align:left"|Meritan Shabani
|0
|1
|1
|-
|31
|DF
|
|style="text-align:left"|Dominik Schmid
|1
|0
|0
|-
|41
|DF
|
|style="text-align:left"|Noah Loosli
|1
|0
|0
|-
|57
|FW
|
|style="text-align:left"|Filipe de Carvalho
|0
|1
|1
|-
|95
|FW
|
|style="text-align:left"|Guilherme Schettine
|1
|0
|1
|-
!colspan=5|Totals
!29
!6
!35

Players in italic left the club during the season.
Cards

{| class="wikitable" style="text-align:center"!width=15
|-
!
!width=15|
!width=15|
!width=15|
!width=145|Name
!width=15|
!width=15|
!width=15|
!width=15|
|-
!rowspan=1|1
|41
|DF
|
|style="text-align:left"|Noah Loosli
|1
|1
|1
|9
|-
!rowspan=1|2
|27
|FW
|
|style="text-align:left"|Renat Dadashov
|8
|0
|0
|8
|-
!rowspan=1|3
|95
|FW
|
|style="text-align:left"|Guilherme Schettine
|6
|0
|0
|6
|-
!rowspan=4|4
|6
|MF
|
|style="text-align:left"|Amir Abrashi
|5
|0
|0
|5
|-
|14
|DF
|
|style="text-align:left"|Tomás Ribeiro
|5
|0
|0
|5
|-
|15
|DF
|
|style="text-align:left"|Ayumu Seko
|2
|1
|0
|5
|-
|28
|MF
|
|style="text-align:left"|Christián Herc
|5
|0
|0
|5
|-
!rowspan=2|8
|40
|MF
|
|style="text-align:left"|Hayao Kawabe
|4
|0
|0
|4
|-
|77
|DF
|
|style="text-align:left"|Bendegúz Bolla
|4
|0
|0
|4
|-
!rowspan=2|10
|10
|MF
|
|style="text-align:left"|Petar Pusic
|3
|0
|0
|3
|-
|31
|DF
|
|style="text-align:left"|Dominik Schmid
|3
|0
|0
|3
|-
!rowspan=4|12
|1
|GK
|
|style="text-align:left"|André Moreira
|2
|0
|0
|2
|-
|7
|MF
|
|style="text-align:left"|Tsiy-William Ndenge
|2
|0
|0
|2
|-
|8
|MF
|
|style="text-align:left"|Giotto Morandi
|2
|0
|0
|2
|-
|22
|FW
|
|style="text-align:left"|Francis Momoh
|2
|0
|0
|2
|-
!rowspan=4|16
|4
|DF
|
|style="text-align:left"|Li Lei
|1
|0
|0
|1
|-
|11
|FW
| 
|style="text-align:left"|Jeong Sang-bin
|1
|0
|0
|1
|-
|25
|DF
|
|style="text-align:left"|Nadjack
|1
|0
|0
|1
|-
|33
|DF
|
|style="text-align:left"|Georg Margreitter
|1
|0
|0
|1
|-
!colspan=5|Totals
!59
!2
!1
!70

League only.

Home Game Attendance

References

External links

Grasshopper Club Zürich seasons
Grasshoppers